A list of films produced in the United Kingdom in 1945:

1945

See also
 1945 in British music
 1945 in British television
 1945 in the United Kingdom

References

External links
 

1944
Films
British
1940s in British cinema